Paseo de La Princesa (Spanish for Promenade of the Princess) is a pedestrian promenade in San Juan, Puerto Rico located in the city's historic district. The promenade is lined with adorned lamp posts and extends for a quarter of a mile along the southern city walls of Old San Juan. It is named after the former La Princesa Prison which is now a historic building that houses the Puerto Rico Tourism Company. The site hosts street vendors, a restaurant and magnificent views of Old San Juan and its bay.

Overview 
The Paseo de La Princesa is often described as one of the most scenic city walkways in the world and, due to its location close to the cruise ship harbor, it is often the starting point for sightseeing in Old San Juan.

The Raíces Fountain located on a plaza at the western end of the promenade is a fountain which contains sculptures that represent and celebrates the ethnic roots of the Puerto Rican identity: the European culture brought by the Spanish and other settlers, the African culture brought by the African slaves and the native Taino culture. This plaza also hosts a small wooden dock that offers great views of San Juan Bay, El Yunque and the Sierra de Luquillo to the east, and of other municipalities such as Cataño and Bayamón to the west.

The iconic Puerta de San Juan (English: San Juan Gate) is the only remaining city gate and it is found close to the western edge of the promenade. This city gate was originally called the Puerta de Agua (Spanish for water gate) because it offered access to San Juan's harbor. Today the gate also offers access to La Fortaleza, the Capilla del Cristo and the Parque de las Palomas. There is also a newly built waterside walkway that continues along the city walls towards El Morro.

Other landmarks and attractions are the Americas Heritage Fountain, the San Justo y Pastor Bastion, the La Concepción Bastion, and a playground for children. The promenade also hosts an open air café and a restaurant that serves traditional Puerto Rican food called Princesa Gastrobar. Piraguas, piña coladas and platanutres (fried plantain chips) are popular drinks and snacks to buy in the esplanade. During the weekends and festival celebrations one can find live music, street vendors, traditional street food and temporary art exhibitions. There is live jazz on Fridays and Saturdays, and salsa music and dance on Saturdays and Sundays.

History 

The area used to host an interim prison, first built in 1837, called La Princesa Prison (Spanish: Antigua Prisión de La Princesa), named after Isabella II of Spain. While the promenade itself dates to 1853, the area originally was used by the Spanish military as an area to provide clear fields of fire for the cannons and guns that were located outside of the city walls. Puerto Rico Governor and Sr. Lieutenant General Don Fernando de Norzagaray foresaw an expansion of the prison and the construction of its tower. The prison had capacity for about 240 prisoners and continued to operate until 1965.

The area where the promenade is located fell into disrepair in the 20th century but after housing was built in the area it was rehabilitated and restored in 1989. The Puerto Rico Tourism Company is now headquartered in the former prison. The company also installed a time capsule in 1995, located on the promenade in front of the former prison building. This time capsule was opened in 2020, and two more capsules were installed afterwards. These capsules are stated to be opened in 2045. La Princesa building also houses a small art exhibition and often hosts cultural events.

Gallery

See also 

 List of streets in San Juan, Puerto Rico

References 

Old San Juan, Puerto Rico
Tourist attractions in San Juan, Puerto Rico
Buildings and structures in San Juan, Puerto Rico
Streets in San Juan, Puerto Rico
Waterfronts
1853 establishments in Puerto Rico
1989 establishments in Puerto Rico
Defunct prisons in Puerto Rico